Leucos panosi, also known as the Acheloos roach, is a species of freshwater fish in the family Cyprinidae. Acheloos and Louros river systems in Greece, and lakes Trichonis and Ambrakia.

References

Leucos
Fish described in 2006
Taxobox binomials not recognized by IUCN